Vindava may refer to:

FK Vindava, a football club in Latvia
Ventspils, a town in Latvia named Vindava before 1917